The 1993–94 Primeira Divisão was the 60th edition of top flight of Portuguese football. It started on 22 August 1993 with a match between Estoril-Praia and Beira-Mar, and ended on 2 June 1994. The league was contested by 18 clubs with Porto as the defending champions.

Benfica won their 30th league title and qualified for the 1994–95 UEFA Champions League group stage. Porto qualified for the 1994–95 European Cup Winners' Cup first round, and Sporting CP, Boavista and Marítimo qualified for the 1994–95 UEFA Cup; in opposite, Paços de Ferreira, Famalicão and Estoril-Praia were relegated to the Liga de Honra. Yekini was the top scorer with 21 goals.

Promotion and relegation

Teams relegated to Liga de Honra
Tirsense
Espinho
Chaves

Tirsense, Espinho and Chaves, were consigned to the Liga de Honra following their final classification in 1992-93 season.

Teams promoted from Liga de Honra
Estrela da Amadora
União da Madeira
Vitória de Setúbal

The other three teams were replaced by Estrela da Amadora, União da Madeira, Vitória de Setúbal from the Liga de Honra.

Teams

Stadia and locations

Managerial changes

League table

Results

Top goalscorers

Source: Foradejogo

Footnotes

External links
 Portugal 1993-94 - RSSSF (Jorge Miguel Teixeira)
 Portuguese League 1993/94 - footballzz.co.uk
 Portugal - Table of Honor - Soccer Library 

Primeira Liga seasons
Port
1993–94 in Portuguese football